The 1st Annual Nickelodeon Kids' Choice Awards, also known as The Big Ballot, was presented over four episodes of Nickelodeon's movie review program Rated K: For Kids by Kids which aired in 1987. Unlike its successor, the Nickelodeon Kids' Choice Awards, the show was less of a televised live event, and more of a pre-produced program. The trophy in this show was a golden teleidoscope. The in-studio hosts for the show were Matt Nespole, Rebecca Schwager, and Mark Shanahan.

History and format
The show was conceived as a way to "honor kids' opinions about movies and television", furthering Nickelodeon's campaign at the time of being a network that was "for kids, by kids". Ballots for the show's awards were cast via mail, and then the winners would tape a thank you video that was shown during the program. These videos were introduced, and broken up by "link" segments, featuring the Rated K cast. While The Big Ballot was seen as a success, producers Alan Goodman, Albie Hecht, and Fred Seibert were brought in to rebrand and re-launch the award show the following year, modeling future KCA's after MTV's Video Music Awards, which was under the same banner network umbrella now that Nickelodeon had been purchased by Viacom.

Winners and nominees
Below is a complete list of nominees and partial list of winners. Winners are listed first, in bold. Other nominees are in alphabetical order.

Movies
The winners were announced on March 28, 1987.

Television
The winners were announced on April 4, 1987.

Music
The winners were announced on April 11, 1987.

Sports
The winners were announced on April 18, 1987.

References

Nickelodeon Kids' Choice Awards
1987 television awards
March 1987 events in the United States
April 1987 events in the United States